Lowry is an unincorporated community in Bedford County, Virginia, United States. Lowry has a post office with ZIP code 24570, which opened on April 12, 1854.

References

Unincorporated communities in Bedford County, Virginia
Unincorporated communities in Virginia